The official German airplay chart ranks the most frequently broadcast songs on German radio stations. In 2017, 19 different songs reached the top, based on weekly airplay data compiled by MusicTrace on behalf of Bundesverband Musikindustrie (BVMI). The radio stations are chosen based on the reach of each station. A specific number of evaluated stations is not given.

Clean Bandit's collaboration "Rockabye" with Jamaican singer and rapper Sean Paul and English singer Anne-Marie was the first song to top the chart in 2017. After two weeks, the single was replaced by "Never Give Up" by Sia. Ed Sheeran's "Shape of You", released in January, reached the number one on 10 February and stayed atop for eight consecutive weeks. The first song by a German artist to top the chart was "Little Hollywood" by DJ Alle Farben and Dutch singer Janieck Devy for four weeks in May and June. "OK" by German DJ Robin Schulz featuring James Blunt, topped the chart for the entirety of August. Pink's "What About Us" was the third longest reigning song of 2017, with five consecutive weeks in September and October. Zayn's "Dusk Till Dawn" featuring Sia, replaced P!nk on issue date 27 October and became the second longest reigning song with six consecutive weeks.

The year concluded with "Perfect" by Sheeran, which topped the chart in the last three weeks. The best-performing single of the year was "Shape of You" by Ed Sheeran. Alongside "Galway Girl" and "Perfect", Sheeran's songs have been played more than 160,000 times on evaluated stations.

Chart history

References

Germany airplay
Airplay 2017